Mark Mazower (born 20 February 1958) is a British historian. His areas of expertise are Greece, the Balkans and, more generally, 20th-century Europe. He is Ira D. Wallach Professor of History at Columbia University in New York City

Early life
Mazower was born in Golders Green and spent most of his early life in north London. His mother was a physiotherapist and his father worked for Unilever. During his youth, Mazower enjoyed playing the French horn and composing classical music.

Mazower's father was of Russian Jewish descent. When Mazower began to write his book What You Did Not Tell: A Russian Past and the Journey Home, he discovered that his grandfather, Max, was a member of the Bund, a Jewish socialist party, was involved in revolutionary activities, and helped print illegal books in Yiddish advocating socialism. Max was regularly arrested by the Tsarist police and was imprisoned twice in Siberia, before eventually fleeing the country and settling in England in 1924. Mazower also discovered that his grandparents continued to hang out with Russian-Jewish revolutionaries in Golders Green. Reflecting on the discovery, Mazower said:

During his youth, Mazower enjoyed reading classical literature and philosophy.

Career

Mazower received his BA in Classics and Philosophy from the University of Oxford in 1981 and his doctorate from the same university in 1988. He also holds an MA in International Affairs from Johns Hopkins University (1983). Prior to his arrival at Columbia, Mazower taught at Birkbeck, University of London, the University of Sussex and Princeton University.

Mazower has also written for newspapers since 2002 such as the Financial Times and for The Independent contributing articles on international affairs and book reviews.

He has been appointed to the Advisory Board of the European Association of History Educators (EUROCLIO).

He is a member of the Editorial Board for Past & Present.

Fields of interest 

Mazower has written extensively on Greek and Balkan history. His book The Balkans won the Wolfson History Prize and Inside Hitler's Greece: The Experience of Occupation, 1941–44, both won the Longman History Today Award for Book of the Year. Salonica, City of Ghosts: Christians, Muslims and Jews 1430–1950 was the Runciman Prize and Duff Cooper Prize winner and was shortlisted for the Hessell-Tiltman Prize.

In addition, Mazower is more broadly concerned with 20th-century European history. His book Dark Continent: Europe's Twentieth Century argued that the triumph of democracy in Europe was not inevitable but rather the result of chance and political agency on the part of citizens, subjects and leaders. 

In Hitler's Empire: Nazi Rule in Occupied Europe, Mazower compared Nazi German occupation policy in different European countries.

Mazower's book, No Enchanted Palace, was published in 2009. It narrates the origins of the United Nations and its strict ties to colonialism and its predecessor organisation, the League of Nations. In Governing the World (2012), this narrative is taken one step further, and the history of international organisations in general is evaluated, beginning with the Concert of Europe at the start of the nineteenth century.

Mazower's 2018 inter-generational biography of his own family, What you did not tell, described their lives, education and politics and how it influences his interest in history, place, and the writing of biography. Caroline Moorehead, an acclaimed biographer, on reviewing this book, wrote of his scholarly reconstruction of a family's life meticulously drawn from archives and collections of papers in the UK, Russia, Belgium and Israel and family diaries, letters and interviews. Not simply a biographical narrative, Moorehead explains, since woven into it is a vast and rich picture of left wing European Jewry from the founding of the Bund workers' union. His prodigious historical reach is matched by his affectionate portrait of a family and a people 'whose fight for justice was based on their own personal knowledge of poverty and exploitation.'

Personal life

In his interview with Mazower, John Crace wrote Mazower "likes walking, football, swimming in Hampstead ponds and dislikes commuting and celebrity culture". In 2021, he was awarded an honorary Greek citizenship for "the promotion of Greece, its long history and culture to the international general public."

Awards and honours

Dido Sotiriou Award of the Hellenic Authors Society, 2012
Society of Columbia Graduates Great Teacher Award - 2011
Honorary doctorate from KU Leuven (during the celebrations of the 30th anniversary of the Master of European Studies) - 2019
Gennadius Prize of the American School of Classical Studies at Athens - 2022

Book Awards 

The Greek Revolution: Duff Cooper Prize - 2022
Hitler's Empire: Trilling Award - 2009
Hitler's Empire: LA Times Book Prize for History - 2009
Salonica, City of Ghosts: Duff Cooper Prize - 2005
Salonica, City of Ghosts: John Criticos Prize - 2005
Salonica, City of Ghosts: Runciman Prize - 2005
Salonica, City of Ghosts: National Jewish Book Award - 2005
Dark Continent: German History Book Prize - 2002
The Balkans: Wolfson Prize for History - 2001
The Balkans: Adolphe Bentinck Prize - 2001
Dark Continent: Premio Acqui Storia - 2001

Shortlisted for 

Governing the World: Hessell-Tiltman Prize - 2013

Publications 
Mazower's publications include:
The Greek Revolution: 1821 and the Making of Modern Europe (Penguin Press, 2021)
"The Man Who Was France" (review of Julian Jackson, De Gaulle, Belknap Press / Harvard University Press, 2018, 887 pp.), The New York Review of Books, vol. LXVII, no. 1 (16 January 2020), pp. 45–46, 48.
What You Did Not Tell: A Russian Past and the Journey Home, (Penguin, 2018. ), family memoir
Governing the World: The History of an Idea (Penguin Group, 13 September 2012. )
No Enchanted Palace: The End of Empire and the Ideological Origins of the United Nations (Princeton University Press, Princeton and Oxford 2009. )
Hitler's Empire: Nazi Rule in Occupied Europe (Allen Lane, 2008)
Networks of Power in Modern Greece, (as editor, C Hurst & Co Publishers Ltd, 2008)
Salonica, City of Ghosts: Christians, Muslims and Jews, 1430–1950 (HarperCollins, 2004)
Ideologies and National Identities: The Case of Twentieth-Century South-Eastern Europe (as co-editor, Central European University Press, 2003)
After the War was Over: Reconstructing the Family, Nation and State in Greece, 1943–1960 (as an editor, Princeton UP, 2000)
The Balkans (Weidenfeld and Nicolson, 2000) from the 'Universal History' series, reprinted as The Balkans: From the End of Byzantium to the Present Day (Phoenix, 2002)
Dark Continent: Europe's Twentieth Century (Knopf, 1998)
The Policing of Politics in the Twentieth Century: Historical Perspectives (as editor, Berghahn, 1997)
Inside Hitler's Greece: The Experience of Occupation, 1941–44 (Yale UP, 1993)
Greece and the Inter-War Economic Crisis, Clarendon Press, 1991 (first published 1989), also translated in Greek by MIET (2002).

References

External links
Mazower's official webpage 
Mazower's page at the Columbia University website
Ethnicity and War in the Balkans- a short article by Mazower
Mazower on the Armenian genocide controversy
Reviews of Mazower books in Foreign Affairs
Jason R. Koepke on a lecture by Mazower
Review of Inside Hitler's Greece on "New Books in History"
Interview at The Guardian
'A League Beneath', a review of No Enchanted Place in the Oxonian Review

1958 births
Living people
British historians
British Jews
Historians of the Balkans
Historians of Europe
Columbia University faculty
Academics of the University of Sussex
Academics of Birkbeck, University of London
Alumni of the University of Oxford
People educated at William Ellis School
Historians of modern Greece
British people of Russian-Jewish descent
Historians of World War II
21st-century biographers